Valenzuela de Calatrava is a municipality in Ciudad Real Province, Castile-La Mancha, Spain. It has a population of 802.

Villages
Valenzuela de Calatrava, Postal Code 13279
Los Mirones, Postal Code 13739. A village established by the Instituto Nacional de Colonización

References

External links
Ayuntamiento de Valenzuela de Calatrava

Municipalities in the Province of Ciudad Real